Admiral Makarov State Maritime Academy is a federal institution of higher professional education (ФБОУ ВПО ) which trains professionals for civil and merchant fleet. The institution was established on 11 September 2021 by order of the Ministry of Transport of the Russian Federation. It is located in St. Petersburg, Russia.

References

Universities and colleges in Saint Petersburg
Maritime organizations